Richard John Rosmini (October 4, 1936 – September 9, 1995) was an American guitarist, at one time considered the best 12-string guitarist in the world. He was best known for his role in the American "folk revival" of the 1960s.

Life
Rosmini was born in New York City and grew up in Greenwich Village, where he learned guitar and began performing in clubs.  During the 1960s, he was employed as the main jewelry photographer for Tiffany & Co.

His 1964 album Adventures for 12 String, 6 String, and Banjo, predates much of John Fahey and Leo Kottke and other American primitive guitarists, which Kottke cited as an early influence. Rosmini was also a noted banjo player. He appeared as a sideman with Bob Gibson at Chicago's Gate of Horn; with Art Podell & Paul Potash at New York's Cafe Wha?; as soloist and singer at Los Angeles' Ash Grove; with Barbara Dane in a concert tour with Bob Newhart; and in association with Pernell Roberts in Bonanza. Rosmini continued his career in music as a sideman on numerous folk albums, including those by Bob Gibson, Eric Weissberg, Dave Van Ronk, Ananda Shankar, Hoyt Axton and others before leaving music to pursue a career in photography.

He subsequently taught recording for over a decade at the University of Southern California and had a hand in the evolution of motion picture sound into its present-day form. In 1978 he wrote a booklet on multitrack recording called TEAC Multitrack Primer. His constant fight to make audio electronics accessible to musicians led to his development of many of Tascam's multitrack and portable multitrack recorders and mixers. He was a consultant to JBL on the musical instrument transducer K-series 120 and 130. He co-designed JBL studio monitors and participated in their integration into Hollywood's top studios.

He died on September 9, 1995 of amyotrophic lateral sclerosis at the age of 58.

Discography
 1964: Adventures for 12-String, 6-String and Banjo (Elektra)
 1969: A Genuine Rosmini (Imperial)
 1973: Sessions (JBL)
 1974: Home Made with Teac

Soundtracks
 1976: Original Soundtrack Recording from the Paramount Motion Picture Leadbelly
 1979: Original Soundtrack Recording from the United Artists Motion Picture The Black Stallion

With others
 1957: I Come For To Sing, Bob Gibson
 1958: There's a Meetin' Here Tonight, Bob Gibson
 1960: Songs Of Earth And Sky, Art and Paul
 1961: Hangin', Drinkin' And Stuff Art and Paul
 1961: Van Ronk Sings, Dave Van Ronk
 1963: Come All Ye Fair And Tender Ladies, Pernell Roberts
 1964: A Folksinger’s Choice, Theodore Bikel
 1964: Changes, Modern Folk Quartet
 1967: Steve Gillette, Steve Gillette
 1968: Song Cycle, Van Dyke Parks
 1969: Greatest Hits, Phil Ochs
 1969: Farewell Aldebaran, Judy Henske & Jerry Yester
 1969: Bob Gibson, Bob Gibson
 1969: The Moonstone, Tommy Flanders
 1969: Sausalito Heliport, Gale Garnett & The Gentle Reign
 1970: To Be Free, Jackie DeShannon
 1970: California Stop Over, Johnny Darrell
 1970: Ananda Shankar, Ananda Shankar
 1971: Sweet Country Suite, Larry Murray
 1971: Songs, Paul Parrish
 1971: Cyrus, Cyrus Faryar
 1971: Songs, Jackie DeShannon
 1972: Let's Spend the Night Together, Claudine Longet
 1972: Malvina, Malvina Reynolds
 1973: Duelin' Banjo, Doug Dillard
 1973: Islands, Cyrus Faryar
 1974: Digby Richards, Digby Richards
 1974: Richard Ruskin, Rick Ruskin
 1974: You Don't Need a Reason to Sing, Doug Dillard
 1975: Microphone Fever, Rick Ruskin
 1975: Southbound, Hoyt Axton
 1977: Six String Conspiracy, Rick Ruskin
 1977: Roadsongs, Hoyt Axton
 1977: More Rod '77, Rod McKuen

References

External links
 Illustrated Dick Rosmini discography

1936 births
1995 deaths
Elektra Records artists